Pieter Moninckx (1606, The Hague – 1686, The Hague), was a Dutch Golden Age painter.

Biography
According to Houbraken he spent 13 years in Rome serving the Pope, and painted genre and conversation pieces in the manner of Gerarts (Houbraken means Gerard van Zyl, whose style is unfortunately unknown today). He died at the age of 80 in the Hague.

According to the RKD he was a member of a well-known and respected painting family, the son of Sybert, and after an extended stay in Rome, worked on decorations for the Huis ter Nieuwburg (since torn down) in 1637, and in 1639 he became a member of the Confrerie Pictura.

External links

References

Pieter Moninckx on Artnet

1605 births
1672 deaths
Dutch Golden Age painters
Dutch male painters
Artists from The Hague
Painters from The Hague